Curtitoma lawrenciana is a species of sea snail, a marine gastropod mollusk in the family Mangeliidae.

Description
The length of the shell varies between 6 mm and 18 mm.

Distribution
This species occurs in the Chukchi Sea, Northeast Russia, in the northern part of the Sea of Japan and off the Aleutians; found at depths between 62 m and 800 m.

References

  Dall, W.H. (1919b) Descriptions of new species of Mollusca from the North Pacific Ocean in the collection of the United States National Museum. Proceedings of the United States National Museum, 56, 293–371
 Dall, William Healey. Summary of the marine shellbearing mollusks of the northwest coast of America: from San Diego, California, to the Polar Sea, mostly contained in the collection of the United States National museum, with illustrations of hitherto unfigured species. No. 112. Govt. print. off., 1921.

External links
  Tucker, J.K. 2004 Catalog of recent and fossil turrids (Mollusca: Gastropoda). Zootaxa 682: 1–1295.
 
 Gulbin, Vladimir V. "Review of the Shell-bearing Gastropods in the Russian Waters of the East Sea (Sea of Japan). III. Caenogastropoda: Neogastropoda." The Korean Journal of Malacology 25.1 (2009): 51–70
 Schonberg, Susan V., Janet T. Clarke, and Kenneth H. Dunton. "Distribution, abundance, biomass and diversity of benthic infauna in the Northeast Chukchi Sea, Alaska: Relation to environmental variables and marine mammals." Deep Sea Research Part II: Topical Studies in Oceanography 102 (2014): 144–163

lawrenciana
Gastropods described in 1919